Carol Greenwood (née Haigh; born 15 March 1966) is an English former runner who won the World Mountain Running Trophy and was twice a national fell running champion.

Greenwood won the World Trophy in Morbegno in 1986. She also finished third at the 1993 World Trophy and second at the 1997 European Mountain Running Trophy.

She ran internationally on other surfaces too, representing her country at the 1984 and 1994 World Cross Country Championships. She ran in the World Women's Road Race Championships in 1984, finishing seventh, and was on the winning team at the Yokohama International Women's Ekiden in the same year.

Domestically, Greenwood won the first English Fell Running Championships in 1986. The middle of her running career was affected by sciatica but she returned to prominence in the early 1990s, winning at Ben Nevis and the Three Peaks Race and having a run of thirty-eight consecutive victories in 1993, when she repeated her English Championships success. One of her wins that year was at the Snowdon Race, where she set a record time of 1:12:48.

References

British fell runners
British female mountain runners
1966 births
Living people
Place of birth missing (living people)